Live and Acoustic is a live album and first CD release from Ray Wilson. It was originally released as Unplugged in late 2001 via his website, but was reissued in 2002 as Live and Acoustic by InsideOut Music. It was recorded in August 2001 during the Edinburgh Fringe Festival for which Wilson played 13 sold out shows.

This was technically the first release by Wilson under his own name following the release of Millionairhead in 1999 by his band, Cut_.

Track listing
 "In the Air Tonight" (Phil Collins)
 "Inside" (Peter Lawlor)
 "Rest in Peace" (Lawlor)
 "Shipwrecked" (Tony Banks, Mike Rutherford)
 "Not About Us" (Banks, Rutherford, Ray Wilson)
 "Another Day" (Wilson)
 "Sarah" (Wilson)
 "Gypsy" (Wilson)
 "Swing Your Bag" (Wilson)
 "Always in My Heart" (Wilson)
 "Lover's Leap" (Taken from "Supper's Ready") (Banks, Collins, Peter Gabriel, Steve Hackett, Rutherford)
 "The Carpet Crawlers" (Banks, Collins, Gabriel, Hackett, Rutherford)
 "Biko" (Gabriel)
 "Mama" (Banks, Collins, Rutherford)
 "Forever Young" (Bob Dylan)
 "Desperado" (Glenn Frey, Don Henley)
 "Born to Run" (Bruce Springsteen)
 "The Airport Song" (Wilson)

Personnel
Ray Wilson - vocals, acoustic guitars
Amanda Lyon - vocals, keyboards
Steve Wilson - guitars, vocals

Ray Wilson (musician) albums
2002 live albums
Inside Out Music live albums